The Central Collegiate Hockey Association (CCHA) is a National Collegiate Athletic Association (NCAA) Division I ice hockey-only conference that has operated during two separate periods. The conference was founded in 1971 and disbanded in 2013 following major conference realignment, with then-member Bowling Green taking ownership of the conference name. In 2021, the CCHA was reestablished with eight members, including Bowling Green. At the completion of each regular season, both versions of the CCHA have held the CCHA Men's Ice Hockey Tournament to determine the conference champion. The tournament champions receive the Mason Cup.

The tournament has had a variety of formats.

The tournament was first hosted at the St. Louis Arena in St. Louis, Missouri with Ohio State winning the inaugural tournament. Michigan State won the most CCHA Men's Ice Hockey Tournaments with eleven while Michigan appeared in the most championship game appearances with seventeen. Ron Mason has coached thirteen championship teams, more than any other CCHA coach, and also has the most championship game appearances as coach with seventeen. The Joe Louis Arena in Detroit, Michigan hosted the tournament from 1982 to 2013. The St. Louis Arena hosted the tournament six times, while the BGSU Ice Arena in Bowling Green, Ohio and Lakeview Arena in Marquette, Michigan each hosted the championship game twice.

In the final championship tournament of the original CCHA in 2013, Notre Dame defeated Michigan.

In February 2020, seven schools that had announced their departures from the Western Collegiate Hockey Association, effective after the 2020–21 season, announced they would start play in a new CCHA in 2021–22. Four of these schools had played in the final season of the original CCHA, and a fifth had briefly been a member.

The CCHA tournament resumed in 2022 with a new format in which all games are played at campus sites. Specifically, the first round consists of best-of-three series, with all games hosted by the higher seed in each matchup; the semifinals are single games hosted by the top two surviving seeds; and the final is also a single game hosted by the highest remaining seed.

Champions

References
General

Specific

External links
CCHA Men's Ice Hockey Tournament

 
College ice hockey in the United States lists